Alias Mike Moran is a lost 1919 American comedy silent film directed by James Cruze and written by Frederick Orin Bartlett and Will M. Ritchey. The film stars Wallace Reid, Ann Little, Emory Johnson, Charles Ogle, Edythe Chapman, and William Elmer. The film was released March 2, 1919, by Paramount Pictures.

Cast

Wallace Reid as Larry Young
Ann Little as Elaine Debaux
Emory Johnson as Mike Moran
Charles Ogle as Peter Young
Edythe Chapman as Ma Young
William Elmer as Tick Flynn
Winter Hall as Mr. Vandecar
Jean Calhoun as Miss Vandecar
Guy Oliver as Jim Day

References

External links 

 
 
 still from the movie

1919 films
1910s English-language films
Silent American comedy films
1919 comedy films
Paramount Pictures films
Films directed by James Cruze
American black-and-white films
Lost American films
American silent feature films
Lost comedy films
1919 lost films
1910s American films